The Bloch MB.220 was a French twin-engine passenger transport airplane built by Société des Avions Marcel Bloch during the 1930s.

Design and development
The MB.220 was an all-metal low-wing cantilever monoplane. It was powered by two Gnome-Rhône 14N radial engines and had a retractable landing gear. Normal crew was four, with room for 16 passengers, with eight seats each side of a central aisle. The prototype first flew on 11 June 1936 at Villacoublay with André Curvale at the controls, and was followed by 16 production aircraft.

Six examples survived the war and were modified as the MB.221 with Wright R-1820-97 Cyclone engines.

Service
By the middle of 1938, the type was being utilised by Air France on European routes. The first service of the type (between Le Bourget and Croydon (in south of London) was flown on 27 March 1938 with a scheduled time of 1 hour 15 minutes. During World War II, most MB.220s were taken over as military transports, including service with German, Free French and Vichy French air forces. Air France continued to fly the aircraft (as MB.221s) after the war on short-range European routes. It sold four aircraft in 1949 but within a year all had been withdrawn from service.

Variants
MB.220
One prototype, registration F-AOHA, and 16 production aircraft with Gnome-Rhône 14N-16 and Gnome-Rhône 14N-17 engines (opposite rotation).
MB.221
Six survivors, registration F-AOHC to F-AOHF, F-AQNM and F-AQNN, re-engined with the Wright R-1820-97 Cyclone.

Operators

Air France
Free French Air Force
Vichy French Air Force
Societé Auxiliaire de Navigation Aérienne

Accidents and incidents
 On March 3, 1940, the prototype of the MB.220 crashed into a mountain near Orange, France in poor weather, killing all three crew on board.
 On September 1, 1941, the Air France MB.220 Languedoc, registration F-AQNL, crashed into a lake on takeoff from Marseille due to engine failure, killing all three crew and 12 of 14 passengers on board.

Specifications (MB.220)

See also

References

MB.220
1930s French airliners
1930s French military transport aircraft
Low-wing aircraft
Aircraft first flown in 1935
Twin piston-engined tractor aircraft